Bonnie Bronson (1940–1990) was an American painter and sculptor and one of Portland, Oregon's most prominent artists during the 1970s–1980s. Randal Davis said that her work showed "an abiding love for the sheer beauty of materials and a fascination with unusual structures and systems."

Bronson was born in Portland in 1940, and attended the University of Kansas, the University of Oregon, and the Portland Art Museum School. She married sculptor Lee Kelly in 1961. After their Portland home and studio were heavily damaged in the Columbus Day Storm of 1962, they purchased a former dairy farm outside of Oregon City, where they spent the rest of their lives. They had one child together Jason who died of leukemia in 1978. In 1990, Bronson died at age 50 in a mountaineering accident on Mazama Glacier on Mount Adams, Washington. An award in her name, the Bonnie Bronson Fellowship, is presented to one Pacific Northwest artist each year.

Works
 Tree of Life (1964), with Lee Kelly
 Leland I (1975), with Lee Kelly

References

External links
 Bronson's Legacy Lives On, Oregon Public Broadcasting

1940 births
1990 deaths
20th-century American painters
20th-century American sculptors
20th-century American women artists
Artists from Portland, Oregon
Pacific Northwest College of Art alumni
Painters from Oregon
Sculptors from Oregon
University of Kansas alumni
University of Oregon alumni